This is a list of manhole cover markings found in New York City.

Markings
 Bell System
 BECo = Brooklyn Edison Company
 BHRR = Brooklyn Heights Railroad
 BMT = Brooklyn-Manhattan Transit Corporation
 BPB = Borough President Brooklyn
 BPM = Borough President Manhattan
 BQT = Brooklyn and Queens Transit Corporation
 BRT = Brooklyn Rapid Transit
 BS = Bureau of Sewers
 BSBQ = Bureau of Sewers, Borough of Queens
 BSBQ = Borough Superintendent of the Borough of Queens
 CIBRR = Coney Island and Brooklyn Railroad
 Citizens Water Supply Co. of Newtown
 ConEdison = Consolidated Edison
 Con Edison Co. = Consolidated Edison
 Conrail = Consolidated Rail Corporation
 CT&ES Co. = Consolidated Telegraph & Electrical Subway Company
 CWSCo. = Citizens Water Supply Company of Newtown
 DCW = Brooklyn Department of City Works
 DEP = Department of Environmental Protection
 DPW = Department of Public Works
 DWS = Department of Water Supply 
 ECS Co. LIM = Empire City Subway Company Limited (also abbreviated as ECS Co LTD)
 EDISON = Edison
 EEICo. = Edison Electric Illuminating Company
 FDNY = FDNY
 GAS = Brooklyn Union Gas
 HPFS = High Pressure Fire Service
 IRT = Interborough Rapid Transit
JWS = Jamaica Water Supply Company of New York
 KCEL&PC = Kings County Electric Light and Power Company
 LIC = Long Island City
 LIRR = Long Island Rail Road
 LIWSCo. = Long Island Water Supply Company
 NY&NJTCo. = New York & New Jersey Telephone Company
 NY&QEL&PCo = New York & Queens Electric Light & Power Company
 NYCTA = New York City Transit Authority
 NYCTS = New York City Transit System
 NYC & HRRR = New York Central & Hudson River Railroad
 NYM = New York Municipal Railway Corporation
 NYRT = New York Rapid Transit Corporation
 NYTCo. = New York Telephone Company
 PSC IRT = Public Service Commission-Interborough Rapid Transit
 PSC MRC = Public Service Commission-Metropolitan Railway Company
 QMT = Queens Midtown Tunnel
 RT NYC = Rapid Transit New York City
 RT NYRT = New York Rapid Transit Corporation
 RTS = Rapid Transit System
 RTS NYC = Rapid Transit System New York City
 STEALTH COMM = Stealth Communications
 WSNY = Water Supply of New York
 Water Supply

References
 Forgotten NY: manhole
 "World Sewer Cover Web site", February, 2001.
 "Photos of NYC Manhole Covers, March, 2013.
 "NYC DEP Weekly Pipeline", August 3, 2010.
"Long Island Star-Journal", August 1, 1945.
 "Manhole Covers", May 27, 2021.

Manhole cover abbreviations
Manhole cover abbreviations
Urban exploration